Rockin the Rocks is a one-day rock festival held in support of the Folks on the Rocks Festival held in Yellowknife, Northwest Territories Canada every summer, on September 1.

2007
The first ever Rockin the Rocks was held at the Folks on the Rocks area, it featured Canadian bands Hedley, and Faber Drive. Local bands included Priscilla's Revenge, Godson and 3 Across Dee Eye. Just after, they featured Detroit duo The White Stripes.

2008
It is rumored that country music legend George Jones, and Kenny Chesney will take part. It is also rumored that Canadian Post-grunge band Three Days Grace will be taking part, no sources back it up. Big & Rich, and Econoline Crush are scheduled to perform.

See also
List of music festivals in Canada

References

External links
 http://www.yellowknife.ca/

Rock festivals in Canada
Music festivals in the Northwest Territories
Music festivals established in 2007
Festivals in Yellowknife